RAN (Remote Area Nurse) is an Australian television program (drama series) that aired on SBS on 5 January 2006. The series was filmed entirely on Masig Island (Yorke Island) in the tropical Torres Strait north of the Cape York Peninsula, the northernmost part of Australia (State of Queensland), and the border with Papua New Guinea.

This is an important series to Torres Strait Islanders, but also to the predominantly Anglo Australian community as it highlights the difference between Islanders and mainland Indigenous Australians and the interactions between Islander and Anglo culture. Islander actors and extras are extensively used.

The series was released on DVD on 20 February 2006.

Outline
First aired in early 2006 on Special Broadcasting Service (SBS) television, it follows the life of Helen Tremain (Susie Porter), the Remote Area Nurse, charged with providing medical services to the remote Torres Strait Islanders community.

Drama
The drama comes from the RAN's necessarily close association with the island Chairman, Russ Gaibui (Charles Passi), and his extensive and somewhat dysfunctional family of wife Ina and grown children Eddie, Solomon, Paul (adopted), Nancy and Faith (adopted) and their families and friends, and other characters on the island including some white Australians.

The season of six episodes covers topics such as: whites fitting into an Islander culture; alcohol misuse and smuggling in Islander communities; family hostility and love; outsider influence on island life; family tension, life and death; seasons in the tropics and the effect on people, marriage and family.

Accuracy
The series is portrayed as telling true stories. Many of the idioms of the drama come from local situations. Islanders speak among themselves in their local dialect with subtitles provided for the wider television audience.

While non-Islanders can only guess at the accuracy of the portrayal, many extras are Islanders and that there was significant assistance from locals in the production.

Cast
Susie Porter - Helen Tremain (Remote Area Nurse) - Logie winner (Best Actress), 2007
Charles Passi - Russ Gaibui (island Chairman)
Billy Mitchell -  Robert Henry Hoffman (Robbo) (barge operator)
Luke Carroll - Paul Gaibui (son of Russ and Ina)
Margaret Harvey - Nancy Gaibui (daughter of Russ and Ina, mother of Faith)
Merwez Whaleboat - Bernadette (de facto wife of Paul Gaigui, mother of two daughters)
Jim Gela - Solomon Gaibui (second and favoured son of Russ and Ina, husband of Lindy and father of Grace; island quarantine officer)
Aaron Fa'aoso - Eddie Gaibui (first son of Russ and Ina; black sheep, but a Christian minister; lives off-island, but visits) 
Serai Zaro - Ina Gaibui (wife of Russ, mother to the clan; quiet, patient, loving and kind; but, capable)
Peta Brady - Lindy Gaibui (white wife of Solomon, mother of Grace)
Belford Lui - Mick Gaibui (brother of Russ, island policeman and church deacon)
Louisa Taylor - Myrtle (mother of Jesus; low mental ability; can be a friend to everyone)
Santa Marina Rodgers - Mrs Augustus (mother of Doug and Ina; former midwife; community elder)
Moses Kaddy - Doug Augustus (son of Mrs and brother of Ina; schizophrenic; lovable rogue)
Norah Bagiri -  Lucy (mother of Daniel, Joey and Jesus (adopted); health worker with the RAN)
Fred Kebisu - Amos (island child)
Bruce Spence - Vince (brother of George; white "entrepreneur", bar owner and "shady" character)
John Brumpton - George (brother of Vince; white "entrepreneur", bar owner and "shady" character)
Felix Williamson - Dr John Bourke (fly-in medical doctor)
Gabriel Ingui - Tuuks (bored islander)

Crew
Penny Chapman - Producer
David Caesar - Director
Catriona McKenzie - Director
Helen Pankhurst - Co-Producer
John Alsop - Writer (Ep 1 & 2)
Alice Addison - Writer (Ep 3 & 4)
Sue Smith - Writer (Ep 5 & 6)
George Mye - Cultural Consultant (Islander, from  Erub (Darnley) Island ; long-time member of local government, and ATSIC Commissioner)
Robyn White - Medical Consultant (nurse; since 1992, a Torres Strait remote area nurse, currently on Masig Island) 
David Bridie - Music Producer
Ian Jones - Director of Photography
Jon Rohde - Production Designer
Greg Apps - Casting Director
Shawn Seet - Film Editor

Episodes 
<onlyinclude>

Awards
The show and cast have won several awards, and been nominated in many more. Below is just some of the wins and nominations.

At the 2006 Australian Film Institute Awards, the show won 3 awards 
 Best Screenplay: Sue Smith (for the fifth episode) 
 Best Actress in a Drama: Susie Porter
 Best Series

At the 2007 Logies, the show won 1 Award  
 Most Outstanding Actress: Susie Porter

Nominated in two other categories 
 Most Outstanding Drama Series, Miniseries or Telemovie
 Most Outstanding New Talent: Aaron Fa'aoso

See also
List of Australian television series

References

External links
 
 AFI Awards

APRA Award winners
Australian drama television series
Special Broadcasting Service original programming
Australian medical television series
Television shows set in Queensland
2006 Australian television series debuts
Indigenous Australian television series